Aransas Pass Independent School District is a public school district based in Aransas Pass, Texas (USA). Aransas Pass serves portions of Aransas, Nueces, and San Patricio counties, including most of the city of Aransas Pass.

In addition to sections of Aransas Pass, the district, within San Patricio County, includes Country Acres, Falman, and a small portion of Ingleside. In Aransas County it also includes a small section of Rockport.

The district operates one high school, Aransas Pass High School.

Finances
As of the 2010-2011 school year, the appraised valuation of property in the district was $625,578,000. The maintenance tax rate was $0.103 and the bond tax rate was $0.004 per $100 of appraised valuation.

Academic achievement
In 2011, the school district was rated "academically acceptable" by the Texas Education Agency.  Forty-nine percent of districts in Texas in 2011 received the same rating. No state accountability ratings will be given to districts in 2012. A school district in Texas can receive one of four possible rankings from the Texas Education Agency: Exemplary (the highest possible ranking), Recognized, Academically Acceptable, and Academically Unacceptable (the lowest possible ranking).

Historical district TEA accountability ratings
2011: Academically Acceptable
2010: Recognized
2009: Academically Acceptable
2008: Academically Acceptable
2007: Academically Acceptable
2006: Academically Acceptable
2005: Academically Acceptable
2004: Academically Acceptable

Schools
In the 2011-2012 school year, the district had students in six schools. 
Regular instructional
Aransas Pass High School (Grades 9-12)
A.C. Blunt Middle School (Grades 7-8)
Charlie Marshall Elementary School (Grades 4-6)
Kieberger Elementary School (Grades 2-3)
H.T. Faulk Early Childhood School (Grades PK-1)
Alternative instructional
Aransas Pass JJAEP (Grades 6-12)

Special programs

Athletics
Aransas Pass High School participates in the boys sports of baseball, basketball, football, and wrestling. The school participates in the girls sports of basketball, softball, and volleyball. For the 2012 through 2014 school years, Aransas Pass High School will play football in Class 2A Division I.
In 1998 the Panther football team was 3a division 2 state semifinalists.

See also

List of school districts in Texas
List of high schools in Texas

References

External links
 

School districts in San Patricio County, Texas
School districts in Nueces County, Texas
School districts in Aransas County, Texas